Green Valley is a steep-sided, ice-filled valley that indents the east side of Ford Massif just north of Janulis Spur, in the Thiel Mountains of Antarctica. The name was proposed by Arthur B. Ford and Peter Bermel, co-leaders of the United States Geological Survey Thiel Mountains party that surveyed these mountains in 1960–61, for David H. Green, camp assistant with the party.

References

Landforms of Ellsworth Land
Valleys of Antarctica